Daniel Goddard is the name of:

 Daniel Goddard (actor) (born 1971), Australian-American model and actor
 Daniel Goddard (canoeist) (born 1983), British slalom canoer
 Daniel Ford Goddard (1850–1922), British civil engineer, businessman and politician